The 2007–2008 Western Michigan Broncos men's basketball team is an NCAA Division I college basketball team competing in the Mid-American Conference (MAC).  The Broncos, 20–12 overall and 12–4 in the conference, captured the MAC West Division championship by four games and earned the No. 2 seed in the conference tournament.  WMU reached the semi-finals of the MAC tournament before falling to No. 3 seed Akron.

During the regular season, Western Michigan defeated No. 25 ranked Davidson College, a team that reached the Elite Eight of the NCAA tournament.  WMU finished the non-conference portion of their schedule 7–7, defeating Davidson, Detroit Mercy, Loyola Chicago, North Carolina Central, Pepperdine, Southern Illinois and Wisconsin–Green Bay.

WMU also retained the Michigan MAC Trophy for the third consecutive season.

Sophomore David Kool and senior Joe Reitz earned First Team All-MAC honors.  Reitz was also named to the MAC All-Tournament team.

Preseason
The Broncos were picked to win the West Division by members of the MAC News Media Association, receiving 23 of 32 possible first place votes ( received six votes and  three).  Western Michigan also received six votes to win the MAC Tournament, which was second to Kent State (7 votes).

Joe Reitz was named to the Preseason All-MAC Team.

Awards
 Derek Drews
 West Division Player of the Week (week 1)
 David Kool
 All-MAC First Team
 3-time West Division Player of the Week (weeks 12, 16, 17)
 Joe Reitz
 All-MAC First Team
 4-time West Division Player of the Week (weeks 2, 7, 13, 14)
 Academic All-District IV First Team
 Mid-American Conference Academic Player of the Week (February 7)

Roster

* Will redshirt the 2007–2008 season

Schedule

|-
!colspan=9 style="background:#6a3e0f; color:#e3bc85;"| Exhibition

|-
!colspan=9 style="background:#6a3e0f; color:#e3bc85;"| Regular season

|-
!colspan=9 style="background:#6a3e0f; color:#e3bc85;"| MAC Tournament

Coaching staff
 Steve Hawkins – Head coach
 Clayton Bates – Assistant coach
 Cornell Mann – Assistant coach
 Andy Hipsher – Assistant coach
 Phil Sayers – Director of Basketball Operations

2008–2009 recruits
Western Michigan signed forwards Muhammed Conteh, Justin Hairston and Flenard Whitfield, center Lemarcus Lowe and guards Mike Douglas and Demetrius Ward during this season.  Each player will be a freshman for the 2008–09 season.  Lowe was rated the #1 Michigan high school center in 2007.

References

Western Michigan
Western Michigan Broncos men's basketball seasons